Baildon was an urban district in the West Riding of Yorkshire, England between 1894 and 1974.

It was enlarged on 1 April 1937 by gaining part of Wharfedale Rural District; 225 acres of the parishes of Esholt and Hawksworth were transferred. Baildon Urban District was abolished under the Local Government Act 1972, becoming part of the City of Bradford Metropolitan District on 1 April 1974. A successor parish was created for the town, called Baildon Town Council.

References

Districts of England abolished by the Local Government Act 1972
History of Yorkshire
Local government in West Yorkshire
Urban districts of England